Cathie Louise Adams (born January 8, 1950) is a Texas politician. She served as party chair of the Republican Party of Texas from October 2009 to June 2010.

In April 2016, Adams broke with Phyllis Schlafly over Schlafly's endorsement on March 11 of Donald Trump for the 2016 Republican presidential nomination. Adams instead supported U.S. Senator Ted Cruz of Texas, Trump's principal challenger whom Adams considers a more conservative choice. Adams subsequently lost the race for vice-chairman in 2016 to Amy Clark of Floresville, south of San Antonio. Incumbent chairman Tom Mechler of Amarillo retained his post after opponent Jared Woodfill of Houston withdrew before final balloting.

References

External links
 

1950 births
Texas Republicans
Texas Republican state chairmen
Women in Texas politics
People from Dallas
People from Plano, Texas
Living people
Eagle Forum
American anti-abortion activists
Activists from Texas
Christians from Texas
21st-century American women politicians
21st-century American politicians